The 2007 Sony Ericsson Open was the 23rd edition of this tennis tournament and was played on outdoor hardcourts. The tournament was part of the ATP Masters Series of the 2007 ATP Tour and was classified as a Tier I event on the 2007 WTA Tour.  The tournament took place at the Tennis Center at Crandon Park in Key Biscayne, Florida, from March 21 through April 1, 2007.

Summary of tournament
Novak Djokovic and Serena Williams were the singles champions. Djokovic won his first Masters Series event of his career; whilst the resurgent Williams beat Henin for the only time in 2007.

Guillermo Cañas' ascent also continued, defeating Roger Federer for the second time in 6 days, and in two consecutive tournaments, making him the only man apart from Rafael Nadal to achieve this feat since 2003. Fellow Argentine David Nalbandian also completed a double over Federer later in the year, beating him at the Madrid and Paris Masters.

The event also featured boys and girls junior singles tournaments, which were won by Kei Nishikori and Sorana Cîrstea respectively.

From 2007 and onwards, for both men's and women's doubles, instead of a normal third set, it is replaced with a third set match tie breaker, where the first team to ten wins the match. Should it be 9–9, the first team to lead by two wins the match.

Finals

Men's singles

 Novak Djokovic defeated  Guillermo Cañas 6–3, 6–2, 6–4

Women's singles

 Serena Williams defeated  Justine Henin 0–6, 7–5, 6–3

Men's doubles

 Bob Bryan /  Mike Bryan defeated  Martin Damm /  Leander Paes 6–7(7–9), 6–3, [10–7]

Women's doubles

 Lisa Raymond /  Samantha Stosur defeated  Cara Black /  Liezel Huber 6–4, 3–6, [10–2]

Boys' singles

 Kei Nishikori defeated  Michael McClune 6–7(2–7), 6–4, 6–1

Girls' singles

 Sorana Cîrstea defeated  Anastasia Pivovarova 6–2, 6–1

References

 
Sony Ericsson Open
Sony Ericsson Open
Sony Ericsson Open
Miami Open (tennis)
Sony Ericsson Open
Sony Ericsson Open
Sony Ericsson Open